Rongzom Chökyi Zangpo, widely known as Rongzom Mahapandita, Rongzom Dharmabhadra, or simply as Rongzompa, was one of the most important scholars of the Nyingma school of Tibetan Buddhism. Together with Longchenpa and Ju Mipham, he is often considered to be one of the three "omniscient" writers of the school. His elder contemporary Atiśa (980–1054) considered Rongzompa to be an incarnation of the Indian ācārya Kṛṣṇapāda, the Great. The Tibetan historian Gö Lotsawa (1392–1481) said of Rongzom that no scholar in Tibet was his equal.

A.W. Barber writes that Rongzom was the first to receive the entire Dzogchen teachings of both Vimalamitra and Vairotsana after the time of those two masters. According to the Blue Annals, Rongzom Chokyi Zangpo ... received the Semde (sems sde) teachings of the Dorje Dudjom transmission line.

David Germano writes "In the eleventh century, Rongzom Chokyi Zangpo was without doubt the greatest Nyingma author, with extensive exoteric and esoteric commentaries."

Positions
Rongzom held that the views of sutra such as Madhyamaka were inferior to that of tantra, as Koppl notes:

Writings
According to a catalog of the commentaries he codified, the collected works of Rongzompa amounted to over 100 volumes, the majority of which are no longer extant. In the 19th century, Ju Mipham, who was particularly influenced by Rongzompa's writings, attempted to gather the surviving works together.

Important surviving works of Rongzom Chokyi Zangpo include:

Entering the Way of the Great Vehicle (Mahayana) – presents a defense and explanation of the Dzogchen tradition in the context of the Mahayana. This text has been translated into English:  Entering the Way of the Great Vehicle: Dzogchen as the Culmination of the Mahāyanā, translated by Dominic Sur ( Snow Lion, 2017, Pages: 272) 
 A commentary on Padmasambhava's Key Instructions: A Rosary of Views  – presents the view of the Nyingma school's nine yanas.
 A commentary on the Manjusrinama-Samgiti.  This has been translated into English in The Wisdom of Manjushri (Sherdor, 2012).
  A commentary on the  Guhyagarbha Tantra
Establishing the Divinity of Appearances – a short text that presents the logical grounds for the pure view of Buddhist tantra. This text has been translated into English (by Heidi Köppl, in Establishing Appearances as Divine, 2008).
 The Great Stage of Buddhahood (Sangs rgyas kyi sa chen mo, Skt. Mahābuddhabhūmī), translated in Rong-zom-pa's discourses on buddhology: a study of various conceptions of buddhahood in Indian sources with special reference to the controversy surrounding the existence of gnosis (jñā-na : ye shes) as presented by the eleventh-century Tibetan scholar Rong-zom Chos-kyi-bzang-po, by Orni Almogi as Volume 24 of Studia philologica Buddhica: Monograph series, The International Institute for Buddhist Studies of the International College for Postgraduate Buddhist Studies, 2009.  Herein, Rongzom argues that on the level of the Buddha, gnosis does not exist, meaning that everything has been transcended and sublimated.

Notes & references

Sources

External links
Peer-reviewed biography of Rongzom Chokyi Zangpo on The Treasury of Lives
 Rongzom Chökyi Zangpo
 TBRC P3816 chos kyi bzang po

Nyingma lamas
Scholars of Buddhism from Tibet
Tibetan Buddhists from Tibet
Tibetan philosophers
11th-century Tibetan people
11th-century lamas